Bassam Dâassi (born 13 September 1980) is a Tunisian former professional footballer who played as a forward. He played in three matches for the Tunisia national team in 2001 and 2002. He was also named in Tunisia's squad for the 2002 African Cup of Nations tournament.

References

External links
 
 

1980 births
Living people
Tunisian footballers
Association football forwards
Tunisia international footballers
2002 African Cup of Nations players
Tunisian Ligue Professionnelle 1 players
Stade Tunisien players
FC Bulle players
CS Sfaxien players
Liberian expatriate footballers
Liberian expatriate sportspeople in Switzerland
Expatriate footballers in Switzerland
Place of birth missing (living people)